Orrell railway station serves the Orrell area of the Metropolitan Borough of Wigan, Greater Manchester, England. It is a small two-platform commuter hub on the Kirkby branch line from Wigan.

From Orrell, trains provide services to Manchester, passing through Wigan's Wallgate station. On the opposite platform, trains served by Northern Trains use the Tontine Tunnel onwards towards the  terminus of this branch line.

The majority of passengers at Orrell use services to Wigan town centre and Manchester. The services to Manchester are significantly busier than those to Kirkby. Usage figures are slightly inflated by the fact that Orrell is the boundary for free Concessionary travel for Manchester residents; pensioners book (free) to Orrell and need only pay from there to areas outside Greater Manchester.

Facilities

The station is unstaffed and has a ticket machine that can be found at street level. Shelters, digital information screens and timetable information boards are located on each platform, with a footbridge linking them.  No step-free access is available, as the station is situated in a cutting below street level and can only be reached via the stairs from the footbridge.

Service 
Eastbound trains continue through to  via .

There is no late evening service after 20:05 and there is no service on a Sunday.  A normal service operates on most Bank holidays.

References

External links 

Railway stations in the Metropolitan Borough of Wigan
DfT Category F1 stations
Former Lancashire and Yorkshire Railway stations
Northern franchise railway stations
Railway stations in Great Britain opened in 1848